How We Do can refer to:

"How We Do" (song), a single released by American rapper The Game
How We Do (album), an album by hip hop duo Das EFX
"How We Do (Party)", a song by Rita Ora